Joseph Harold Weiss (January 27, 1894 in Chicago, Illinois – July 7, 1967 in Cedar Rapids, Iowa) was a first baseman for the Chicago Whales professional baseball team in 1915.

External links

1894 births
1967 deaths
Major League Baseball first basemen
Chicago Whales players
Green Bay Bays players
Muskogee Mets players
Independence Producers players
Baseball players from Chicago